Gjerstad is a municipality in Agder county, Norway. It is located in the traditional region of Sørlandet, in the southeastern part of the county, along the border with Telemark county.  The administrative centre of the municipality is the village of Gjerstad. Other villages in the municipality include Ausland, Eikeland, Fiane, Gryting, Østerholt, Rød, Sundebru, and Vestøl.

The  municipality is the 256th largest by area out of the 356 municipalities in Norway. Gjerstad is the 258th most populous municipality in Norway with a population of 2,427.

General information
The parish of Gjerstad was established as a municipality on 1 January 1838 (see formannskapsdistrikt law). The borders have not changed since that time.

Name
The municipality (originally the parish) is named after the old Gjerstad farm, since the Gjerstad Church was built there. One explanation of the name says that the first element is the genitive case of the male name Geirrekr and the last element is staðir which means "homestead" or "farm".  Another possibly explanation of the first part of the name says that it comes from the word geirr which means "spear". Historically, the name has been spelled Gerikstadum (c. 1400), Gierestat (c. 1567), Gierrestad, and Gjerrestad.

Coat of arms
The coat of arms was granted on 18 April 1986. The official blazon is "Gules, three knives argent in fess palewise points to the base". This means the arms have a red field (background) and the charge is three knives pointing downwards. The knives have a tincture of argent which means it is commonly colored white, but if it is made out of metal, then silver is used. The knife was chosen as a symbol for the smithies and knife makers in the municipality. Knife making has long been a local tradition for which Gjerstad is well known. The arms were designed by Odd Kjell Mostad.

Churches
The Church of Norway has one parish within the municipality of Gjerstad. It is part of the Aust-Nedenes prosti (deanery) in the Diocese of Agder og Telemark.

History

Until about 1650, the prestegjeld of Gjerstad (the precursor to today's municipality) was named Vissedal (from vidr-ser-dalr meaning "wood-sea-dale"), a very proper description of the area. Gjerstad has been inhabited from the Stone Age and Viking Age through modern times. Agriculture has long been important, and until only decades ago the more marginal outfields in Upper Gjerstad were still utilized. Forestry also provided an important historic economic contribution, and logs were driven on rivers and streams in the municipality. To aid log transport by floating, numerous dams were constructed. Eikeland Ironworks were a significant contribution to the economy as well.

Geography
Gjerstad municipality has numerous glacially formed features, including a U-shaped valley, tarns, and lakes, most notably the large lake Gjerstadvatnet. It located in Agder county and it is bordered to the north by Nissedal and Drangedal municipalities (both in Vestfold og Telemark county); to the east by Kragerø municipality (also in Telemark); to the south by Risør municipality; and to  the southwest by Vegårshei municipality. There are several larger roads that traverse Gjerstad: European route E18, Norwegian County Road 417, and Norwegian County Road 418.

Government
All municipalities in Norway, including Gjerstad, are responsible for primary education (through 10th grade), outpatient health services, senior citizen services, unemployment and other social services, zoning, economic development, and municipal roads. The municipality is governed by a municipal council of elected representatives, which in turn elect a mayor.  The municipality falls under the Agder District Court and the Agder Court of Appeal.

Municipal council
The municipal council of Gjerstad is made up of 17 representatives that are elected to four year terms. Currently, the party breakdown is as follows:

Attractions
 The remains of Eikeland Ironworks can still be seen in the upper valley. Gjerstad was known for its handmade knives and the coat-of-arms recognizes this heritage.
 Horga was a former pagan place of sacrifice which was destroyed by Olav Trygvason, during the introduction of Christianity to Gjerstad.
 Holmen Gård in Gjerstad is the site of a former farm. It was a Norwegian national center for folk art and handicraft until it was sold into private ownership in 2013. The site has been awarded the St. Olaf's Rose (Olavsrosa), a hallmark for Norwegian Heritage which designates especially distinguished places.

Notable residents

 Hans Mathias Abel (1738–1803) the priest at Gjerstad Church 1785 to 1804
 Søren Georg Abel (1772–1820) a Norwegian priest and politician, the priest at Gjerstad from 1804 to 1821
 Niels Henrik Abel (1802–1829), a distinguished Norwegian mathematician spent his boyhood in the rectory at Gjerstad, died young of TB
 Svenum Jensen Vævestad (1849 in Gjerstad – 1898) a farmer and politician
 Morten Ansgar Kveim (1892 in Gjerstad – 1966) a pathologist, described the Kveim test
 Magnhild Hagelia (1904 in Gjerstad – 1996) a Norwegian politician
 Jan Olav Olsen (born 1950) a politician, Mayor of Gjerstad, 1991 to 1999
 Inger Løite (born 1958 in Gjerstad) a Norwegian politician
 Knut Magne Valle (born 1974 in Gjerstad) a heavy metal guitarist, songwriter, composer, recording studio owner, record producer and music arranger
 Torbjørn Urfjell (born 1977) a Norwegian politician

References

External links

Municipal fact sheet from Statistics Norway 

Welcome to Holmen Gård in Gjerstad
Gjerstad.org 
Culture in Gjerstad on the map 

 
Municipalities of Agder
1838 establishments in Norway